Matthew B. Crawford is an American writer and research fellow at the Institute for Advanced Studies in Culture at the University of Virginia. Crawford majored in physics as an undergraduate, then turned to political philosophy. He earned his PhD from the University of Chicago. He is a contributing editor at The New Atlantis, and professes to be a motorcycle mechanic.

Marshall Institute
In September 2001, Crawford accepted a position as executive director of the George C. Marshall Institute, but left the institute after five months, saying that "the trappings of scholarship were used to put a scientific cover on positions arrived at otherwise. These positions served various interests, ideological or material. For example, part of my job consisted of making arguments about global warming that just happened to coincide with the positions taken by the oil companies that funded the think tank."

He appeared in the 2014 documentary, Merchants of Doubt.

Books
 Shop Class as Soulcraft: An Inquiry Into the Value of Work. Penguin Press, 2009. . Published in London as The Case for Working with Your Hands. Viking, 2009. .
 The World Beyond Your Head: On Becoming an Individual in an Age of Distraction. Farrar, Straus and Giroux, 2015. 
 Why We Drive: Toward a Philosophy of the Open Road, William Morrow, 2020.

References

Further reading

External links
Feature-length radio interview with KGNU Claudia Cragg on 'Shop Class as Soul Craft'

Motorcycling writers
Living people
Year of birth missing (living people)
George C. Marshall Institute